Ischnacanthus is an extinct genus of jawed fish in the class Acanthodii. It lived during Pridoli to Lochkovian, type species I. gracilis is only known from Lochkovian.

Discovery and naming

Ischnacanthus was first discovered in 1861 by Egerton, and later assigned to Isnacanthidae by A. S. Woodward in 1891. The type specimen that defines this species is named Ischnacanthus gracilis, and helps outline the Ischnacanthidae family it belongs to. Fossils of this fish were first discovered in Tillywhandland Quarry, Forfar, Scotland. The Acanthodians, the class Ischnacanthus is home to, are the subject of some dispute over their systematic position because they have features of both bony fish, the Osteichthyes, and cartilaginous fish, the Chondrichthyes.

Description
Ischnacanthus was a fish in the class Acanthodii that had a long body covered in mosaic-like scales. They possess highly advanced, spindle-shaped bodies that were thought to have made them swift swimmers. This fish had two narrow dorsal spines, one either side of and just behind its head. It was a predatory fish that possessed a mouth with very small teeth on the lower jaw. The feature all Acanthodians share in common is the fact that massive spines, formed of dentine, support all fins other than the caudal fins. This species probably lived in Lake Forfar, which is a fresh-water lake surrounded by volcanoes.

References

Acanthodii genera
Early Devonian fish
Devonian acanthodians
Extinct animals of Europe